Ahmed Baly (born 3 February 1976) is an Egyptian judoka.

Achievements

References
 

1976 births
Living people
Egyptian male judoka
Judoka at the 2000 Summer Olympics
Olympic judoka of Egypt
Place of birth missing (living people)
20th-century Egyptian people
21st-century Egyptian people
African Games medalists in judo
Competitors at the 2003 All-Africa Games
African Games bronze medalists for Egypt